The following lists events that happened during 1962 in Laos.

Incumbents
Monarch: Savang Vatthana 
Prime Minister: Boun Oum (until 23 June), Souvanna Phouma (starting 23 June)

Events

May
6 May - Luang Namtha is abandoned by Lao Royal Forces, ending the Battle of Luang Namtha.

July
23 July - The International Agreement on the Neutrality of Laos is signed.

September
10 September - Operation Pincushion ends.

Deaths
21 November - Henri Déricourt, former French SOE agent, 53 (b. 1909)

References

 
1960s in Laos
Years of the 20th century in Laos
Laos
Laos